Charles Trudeau may refer to:

 Charles-Émile Trudeau (1887–1935), Canadian businessman and father of Canadian Prime Minister Pierre Trudeau and grandfather of Canadian Prime Minister Justin Trudeau
 Charles Trudeau (politician) (1743–1816), mayor of New Orleans, Louisiana, USA